Great Burstead is an urban settlement in Essex, England - it is contiguous with the town of Billericay.

History

By tradition, the origins of the church, St Mary Magdalene, at Great Burstead are linked to Saint Cedd (d.664). Cedd, a missionary monk and later Bishop of the East Saxons, was trained by the Celtic Saint Aidan at Lindisfarne. Cedd's original chapel at Bradwell-juxta-Mare in Essex can still be visited. It is understood that at first he set up his wayside preaching cross on the present-day church site, and a well which he blessed, then after he converted Ebba, the Thane of Great Burstead. However, it is also reputed that the East Saxon King Sæberht (d 616) was buried nearby, a convert under the earlier Christian mission of Mellitus, the first Bishop of London. The area first having been settled by the East Saxons around 527 AD. Later, around 680 AD, the cross was replaced with a wooden building by the Thane, Edwy, perhaps dedicated by Theodore of Tarsus, Archbishop of Canterbury. An ancient English Yew, found to the south of the church and over a millennium old, is thought to be one of Essex's oldest trees.

In 1086 the Norman Domesday Book stated that Great Burstead village contained 150 sheep, two horses, 3 teams of oxen, and 118 householders (villagers), and was owned by Odo of Bayeux, William the Conqueror's half brother.

In 1381 the Peasants' Revolt took place, and after the death of Wat Tyler in London, the Essex men retreated back to Billericay. The Battle of Billericay took place on the 28th June 1381 probably in Norsey Wood; 500 Essex man were killed, and over 700 horses were captured. The men are believed to be buried along with their leaders in the church of St Mary Magdalene, Great Burstead.

Thomas Watts, a local Great Burstead draper, was burned at the stake in Chelmsford for refusing to pray in church under Queen Mary I. On 9 June 1555, Thomas was buried in Great Burstead Church.

South Green, today a residential area of Great Burstead, also consisting of shops and a public green space, in medieval times was likely to have been used for archery practice, the local sign today depicts this.

Born in Great Burstead in 1582 was Christopher Martin, a Merchant and local property owner, who married Mary Prowe in Burstead church in 1607. Martin became churchwarden at St Mary Magdalene Church in 1611. In 1620 he became the Governor of the Mayflower ship, and purchasing agent for supplies, and a signer of the Mayflower Compact in 1621. He died on the 8th January 1621 in Plymouth, Massachusetts.

The complete census can be viewed, as can a listing of many of the historical public houses.

On the 24th September 1916, German Zeppelin L32 was shot down by 2nd Lt Frederick Sowrey of the Royal Flying Corps. The airship narrowly missed Billericay High Street and crashed in fields just off from Greens Farm lane Great Burstead, killing all 22 crew.

The Great Burstead parish, abolished 1934, also covered Billericay.  The parish formed part of the Billericay Rural District from 1894 and Billericay Urban District from 1934. The district was renamed Basildon Urban District in 1955 and became part of the present-day Basildon district in 1974.

The village has South Green as its main shopping district. As of 2020, the district was in reality only a small parade of related businesses. It consisted of about ten units each for a different customer-facing business, with the following businesses included: pharmacy, take-away shop, post office, doctor's surgery (GP), convenience store, and florists. More or less next to the parade of shops is a scenic green bounded by the parade, houses, a memorial hall, a petrol station, and roads.

The Great Burstead cricket team was formed in 1956. It has recently merged with East Hanningfield CC but will continue to play in the T Rippon Mid-Essex League.

Governance
Great Burstead is part of electoral ward called Burstead. The population of this ward at the 2011 census was 10,620.

See also
 Little Burstead

References

External links
 Great Burstead & South Green Parish Council
 Great Burstead Church
 Basildon Heritage
 Basildon Borough History - Burstead
 

Populated places in Essex
Borough of Basildon
Aviation accidents and incidents locations in England